This article includes a List of National Historic Landmarks in West Virginia.

National Historic Landmarks in West Virginia

There are 16 National Historic Landmarks in the state. The following is a complete list.

|}

See also
National Register of Historic Places listings in West Virginia
List of National Historic Landmarks by state

References

External links 

 National Historic Landmarks Program, at National Park Service

West Virginia

 
National Historic Landmarks